First Methodist Episcopal Church, also known as United Methodist Church, is a historic church at 116 East Washington Avenue in Washington, Warren County, New Jersey. It was built from 1895 to 1898 with a Richardsonian Romanesque architectural style. The church was added to the National Register of Historic Places for its significance in architecture on July 17, 2017. The parsonage, built 1892, is also included in the listing.

History
The first building constructed here was a wooden church built in 1825. A fire destroyed it in 1856 and the congregation replaced it with a brick building. In 1895, the brick building was deconstructed to allow construction of the current church.

Description
The church was designed by Samuel A. Brouse in a Richardsonian Romanesque architectural style. It is built using green serpentine stone and has pink sandstone accents. The form is asymmetrical, with a round tower on one side and a taller, square bell tower of the other.

Gallery

See also 
 National Register of Historic Places listings in Warren County, New Jersey
 List of Methodist churches in the United States

References

External links

Washington, New Jersey
Churches completed in 1898
19th-century Methodist church buildings in the United States
Richardsonian Romanesque architecture in New Jersey
National Register of Historic Places in Warren County, New Jersey
Churches on the National Register of Historic Places in New Jersey
New Jersey Register of Historic Places
Stone churches in New Jersey
United Methodist churches in New Jersey